Adam Chennoufi (born 4 July 1988) is a Swedish footballer of Moroccan descent who plays as a midfielder for Umeå FC.

Career
On 4 February 2020, Chennoufi returned to Umeå FC on a season-long loan deal from Team TG FF.

References

External links

1988 births
Living people
Swedish footballers
Umeå FC players
GIF Sundsvall players
IFK Värnamo players
Allsvenskan players
Superettan players
Association football midfielders
Sportspeople from Umeå